Scott Robson (born 15 August 1971) is a former international speedway rider from England.

Speedway career 
Robson reached the final of the British Speedway Championship in 1995. He rode in the top tier of British Speedway from 1987 to 2005, riding for various clubs.

Family
His brother Stuart Robson is also a speedway rider, as was his father John Robson.

References 

Living people
1971 births
British speedway riders
Belle Vue Aces riders
Berwick Bandits riders
Coventry Bees riders
Eastbourne Eagles riders
Hull Vikings riders
Middlesbrough Bears riders
Newcastle Diamonds riders
Rye House Rockets riders
Workington Comets riders